Matthew Smailes (25 March 1899 – 1978) was an English footballer who played for Blackburn Rovers, West Ham United and Coventry City as a half-back.

Born in Lancaster, Lancashire, Smailes began his career at Annfield Plain before moving to Blackburn Rovers, where he made four league appearances.

Signed as an understudy to Jimmy Collins, Jim Barrett or Albert Cadwell, Smailes made his debut for West Ham United on 9 February 1929, in a game that saw Vic Watson smash six goals past Leeds United. He played 10 league and cup games for the east London club.

Smailes played 11 Third Division South games for Coventry after leaving West Ham. He joined Ashington in August 1931.

References

External links
Matthew Smailes at westhamstats.info

1899 births
1978 deaths
Sportspeople from Lancaster, Lancashire
English footballers
Association football defenders
Annfield Plain F.C. players
Blackburn Rovers F.C. players
West Ham United F.C. players
Coventry City F.C. players
Ashington A.F.C. players
English Football League players